The 1977 German motorcycle Grand Prix was the third round of the 1977 Grand Prix motorcycle racing season. It took place on 8 May 1977 at the Hockenheimring circuit.

500cc classification

350 cc classification

250 cc classification

125 cc classification

50 cc classification

Sidecar classification

References

German motorcycle Grand Prix
German
German Motorcycle Grand Prix